Bradley Thomas James Wheal (born 28 August 1996) is a cricketer who plays for Hampshire and has been called up to represent Scotland. He is a right-handed fast medium bowler who bats right-handed. He made his One Day International debut for Scotland against the Hong Kong in the 2015–17 ICC World Cricket League Championship on 26 January 2016. He made his Twenty20 International debut for Scotland against Hong Kong on 30 January 2016.

Early life
Wheal was born in Durban, South Africa, on 28 August 1996 to a Scottish mother. He attended Clifton School in Durban, where he matriculated in December 2014. He began his cricketing career with the Kwazulu-Natal youth teams, where he played up to under-19 level. He also represented the province in youth field hockey. While playing under-19 cricket, he was spotted by Hampshire coach Dale Benkenstein, who is also an assistant coach with the Dolphins in Durban.

Domestic career
Wheal impressed Benkestein and was offered a development contract with Hampshire for the 2015 season due to a shortage of fast bowlers at the county, with only Chris Wood and Tom Barber as available backups to the first team side.

Wheal impressed greatly in pre-season, performing well in games on the tour of Barbados and in a friendly against Kent. A strong performance then against Middlesex 2nd XI for Hampshire's 2nd XI where he took 10 wickets in the match and earned himself a call up to the first team for the match against Middlesex on 17 May 2015. Hampshire batted first in this match where Wheal batted at number 10 finishing 3 not out. In Middlesex's 1st innings Wheal took the wicket of opener Sam Robson for 10 runs by bowling him out. He finished with figures of 1/97 from his 20 overs as Middlesex where bowled out for 362. The match, which was rain affected, would end in a draw.

In April 2022, he was bought by the London Spirit for the 2022 season of The Hundred.

International career
Wheal holds a British passport through his parentage. After joining Hampshire, he expressed an interest in representing England upon fulfilling the residential qualifications.

Wheal is qualified to represent Scotland through his mother. In August 2015 he played for a Scotland XI against MCC at Titwood, Glasgow, taking seven wickets. He was subsequently fast-tracked to selection for the full Scotland team, and in December 2015 was named in the squad for the tour of Hong Kong, that took place the following month.

In September 2021, Wheal was named in Scotland's provisional squad for the 2021 ICC Men's T20 World Cup.

References

External links
 
 

1996 births
Living people
Scottish cricketers
Scotland One Day International cricketers
Scotland Twenty20 International cricketers
South African emigrants to the United Kingdom
Hampshire cricketers
Cricketers from Durban
Naturalised citizens of New Zealand
London Spirit cricketers
Gloucestershire cricketers
Warwickshire cricketers